The Union Medal is a medal of the British Ornithologists' Union, given "in recognition of eminent services to ornithology and to the Union and ornithology." From 2019 it is to be known as the "Janet Kear Union Medal", after Janet Kear, with a  new medal design.

In his history of the BOU, History of the Union, Guy Montfort wrote:

The BOU introduced the Godman-Salvin Medal, awarded "to an individual as a signal honour for distinguished ornithological work.", and nowadays the Union Medal recognises people "who have given distinguished service to the Union itself".

Medallists 

Medallists include:

	1912 Walter Goodfellow, C. H. B. Grant
	1948 Willoughby P. Lowe
	1953 A. W. Boyd
	1959 W. B. Alexander, E. A. Armstrong, David Armitage Bannerman, Evelyn Baxter, Peter M Scott
	1960 C. W. Benson
	1967 Salim Ali
	1968 J. M. M. Fisher, Charles R. S. Pitman
	1969 C. W. Mackworth-Praed
	1970 L. H. Brown
	1971 Stephen Marchant, Henry Neville Southern, Bernard Stonehouse
	1972 Derek Goodwin, Norman W. Moore
	1973 Beryl Patricia Hall
	1975 Karel H. Voous
	1976 Ken Williamson, G. C. Shortridge, Alexander F. R. Wollaston
	1979 Ken E. L. Simmons
	1980 Geoffrey V. T. Matthews
	1984 Stanley Cramp, Philip A. D. Hollom, Guy Mountfort
	1987 Ian Newton
	1988 James F. Monk
	1989 Robert Spencer
	1991 F. B. M. Campbell
	1992 Michael Philip Harris
	1993 Ronald M. Lockley
	1995 R. Tory Peterson
	1996 Christopher J. Mead
	1997 Robert A. F. Gillmor, John Sidney Ash
	1998 Janet Kear
	2004 Gwen Bonham
	2008 Christopher J. Feare
	2011 Peter Jones
	2012 Andy Gosler
	2013 Neil J. Bucknell
       2015 John Croxall
 2016 Chris Perrins
 2017 Prof Jenny Gill (former BOU President)

See also

 List of ornithology awards

References 

Ornithology awards
British awards
Awards established in 1912
1912 establishments in the United Kingdom